Bălteni may refer to several places in Romania:

Bălteni, Olt, a commune in Olt County
Bălteni, Vaslui, a commune in Vaslui County
Bălteni, a village in Tigveni Commune, Argeș County
Bălteni, a village in C.A. Rosetti Commune, Buzău County
Bălteni, a village in Conţeşti Commune, Dâmboviţa County
Bălteni, a village in Probota Commune, Iaşi County
Bălteni, a village in Periș Commune, Ilfov County
Bălteni, a village in Copăceni Commune, Vâlcea County
Băltenii de Jos and Băltenii de Sus, villages in Beștepe Commune, Tulcea County

See also
Bâlteni, a commune in Gorj County